James Hamilton (before 1875 – after 1894) was a Scottish footballer who played as a centre forward.

Career
Born in Glasgow, Hamilton played club football for Queen's Park, Rangers and Airdrieonians, and scored three goals in three appearances for Scotland.

He played for Queen's Park between 1884 and 1894, scoring 56 goals in 88 Cup appearances for the club.

Personal life
His brothers Alexander and Gladstone were also Scottish international players.

References

Scottish footballers
Scotland international footballers
Scottish Football League players
Queen's Park F.C. players
Rangers F.C. players
Airdrieonians F.C. (1878) players
Association football forwards
Footballers from Glasgow
Year of death missing
Place of death missing
Year of birth uncertain